UrbanGrowth NSW Development Corporation (known as UrbanGrowth NSW) was an agency of the Government of New South Wales, between 2013 and 2019. It replaced the Sydney Metropolitan Development Authority.

Up until its abolition, UrbanGrowth NSW worked with government, private and community partners to facilitate economic development, including the renewal of urban places across metropolitan Sydney. The chief executive officer of the corporation was Barry Mann. 

Following the 2019 state election, the activities of UrbanGrowth NSW were merged into Infrastructure NSW with effect from 1 July 2019.

References

External links
 UrbanGrowth NSW Development Corporation website

Defunct government entities of New South Wales
2013 establishments in Australia
Government agencies established in 2013
2019 disestablishments in Australia
Government agencies disestablished in 2019